Mohd Tarmizi bin Idris is a Malaysian politician from UMNO. He has been the Member of Perak State Legislative Assembly for Kenering from 2004 to 2022.

Politics 
He is the Deputy Chairman of UMNO Lenggong branch and the Chairman of Yayasan Perak.

Election result

Honours 
  :
  Member of the Order of the Defender of the Realm (AMN) (2007)
  :
  Knight Commander of the Order of the Perak State Crown (DPMP) – Dato’ (2009)

Reference 

Members of the Order of the Defender of the Realm
United Malays National Organisation politicians
Members of the Perak State Legislative Assembly
Malaysian people of Malay descent
Living people
Year of birth missing (living people)